Edward Ross (29 January 1860 – 14 April 1937) was a New Zealand cricketer. He played in two first-class matches for Canterbury in 1883/84.

See also
 List of Canterbury representative cricketers

References

External links
 

1860 births
1937 deaths
New Zealand cricketers
Canterbury cricketers
Cricketers from Christchurch